Richard Landis Miller (February 5, 1907 – May 27, 1983) was an American politician who served in the West Virginia House of Delegates. A Democrat, he lost to Orton R. Karickhoff in 1972 but won a rematch in the newly-drawn 9th district two years later. He retired after one term.

References

1907 births
1983 deaths
Democratic Party members of the West Virginia House of Delegates